Earl Tanner Britton (July 15, 1903 – October 24, 1973) was a professional American football fullback who played in the  National Football League (NFL) and the American Football League. Born in Elgin, Illinois, he attended Elgin High School and played college football at the University of Illinois at Urbana–Champaign.

His career as a placekicker/punter lasted from 1925 to 1929. He played for the Chicago Bears, the Brooklyn Lions, the Dayton Triangles, the Frankford Yellow Jackets, and the Chicago Cardinals.

Earl was the son of Benjamin Harold Britton and Edna May Tanner.  He was a first cousin to music educator Allen Perdue Britton.

References 
Pro-football

External links

1903 births
1973 deaths
Sportspeople from Elgin, Illinois
Players of American football from Illinois
American football fullbacks
American football placekickers
American football punters
Brooklyn Lions players
Illinois Fighting Illini football players
Chicago Bears players
Chicago Cardinals players
Dayton Triangles players